The various Naga ethnic groups have their own distinct festivals.

List 
The group-specific festivals are:

Inter–ethnic festivals 
To promote inter-group interaction, the Government of Nagaland has organized the annual Hornbill Festival since 2000. Other inter-tribe festivals are Lui Ngai Ni and Naga New Year Festival.

See also 
 List of traditional Naga games and sports

References 

 
 
Festivals in Asia
Traditional